AAIA may refer to:

 Aden-Abyan Islamic Army, Islamist group, Yemen
 Air Accident Investigation Authority, a Hong Kong government agency
 Associate of the Association of International Accountants, see Association of International Accountants#Membership
 Association on American Indian Affairs
 Australian Archaeological Institute at Athens, foreign archaeological institute in Greece
 Automotive Aftermarket Industry Association, former name of the Auto Care Association